2-Methylphenethylamine (2MPEA) is an organic compound with the chemical formula of . 2MPEA is a human trace amine associated receptor 1 (TAAR1) agonist, a property which it shares with its monomethylated phenethylamine isomers, such as amphetamine (α-methylphenethylamine), and  (a trace amine).

Very little data, even on toxicity, is available about its effects on humans other than that it activates the human TAAR1 receptor.

References

Phenethylamines
TAAR1 agonists